Divinity Roxx is a Grammy-nominated American recording artist, composer, and musician. Her work includes elements of rhythm and blues, hip hop, funk, soul, and rock. As a rapper and bassist, her performances have been reviewed as radical and distinctive because of her unique ability to combine vigorous bass lines with simultaneous tongue-twisting yet authoritative rapping.

She is best known for touring and performing with Beyoncé Knowles (2006–2011) as her bassist and Musical Director for "The Beyoncé Experience"  and "I Am... World Tour". On the "I Am...Sasha Fierce" World tour, Divinity also helped compose music alongside Bibi McGill, Brittani Washington and Rie Tsuji. She has appeared in three DVDs with Beyoncé including The Beyoncé Experience Live, I Am... Sasha Fierce, and I Am... Yours. She has also appeared in two videos, "Irreplaceable" and "Green Light". Divinity has performed with Beyonce at The White House for President Barack Obama and Michelle Obama during a State Dinner for the President of Mexico, Felipe Calderon. She also performed with Beyonce during her Glastonbury performance. She has also performed on the Grammy's, The BET Awards, MTV Music Awards, Ellen, The Oprah Winfrey Show, Saturday Night Live, Good Morning America, The Today Show and 
countless other television shows with Beyonce. In 2014, Divinity played bass on The Arsenio Hall Show and The Queen Latifah Show with Atlanta born rapper, B.o.B. Divinity has also appeared on Big Morning Buzz Live With Nick Lechey and The Wendy Williams Show with singer [K.Michelle].

In 2021, Divinity released her debut Family Music Album, Ready, Set Go!, turning her attention to the audience she feels matters most. From start to finish, her new album, Ready, Set, Go, is about positivity in mind and body. Two of the songs from the album, Happy and Healthy and Me + You were published by Scholastic as fully illustrated picture books. The books were illustrated by NaShanta Fletcher and were part of Scholastic's Family and Community Engagement initiative.

Early career 

In October 2000, Divinity attended Victor Wooten's Bass Nature Camp at Montgomery Bell State Park near Nashville, Tennessee. There she met Victor Wooten and his brothers Regi, Joseph, Roy, and Rudy. Once the camp was over, Victor asked Divinity to tour with him. She began touring with Wooten's band where she was a featured part of the show from 2000-2005. She is recorded on Wooten's Live in America (2001)  and Soul Circus (2005) albums  under the names D. Walker  and MC Divinity. She also appears on Victor Wooten's album, Words and Tones (2012)

Solo Recordings 

Ain’t No Other Way (2003)

Divinity's first album Ain't No Other Way was self-released in 2012 while touring with Victor Wooten. The album featured production from will.i.am, DJ Lethal, and Mike Elizondo.

The Roxx Boxx Experience (2012)

Divinity's second EP, The Roxx Boxx Experience, was released in October 2012. The album featured Divinity Roxx (bass, lead vocals), Matt McMoots (guitar, backing vocals, backing bass), Omar Gusmao (guitar, backing vocals), and Carlos McSwain (drums, backing vocals). The album was mixed by Eric Racy and Mastered by Chris Gehringer for Sterling Sound 

ImPossible (2016)

Divinity released ImPossible (album) April 19, 2016. This is album features elements of funk, soul, rock, hip-hop and jazz.

Ready Set Go!

Divinity released Ready Set Go! November 5, 2021. This was her first Children's music album that featured elements of hip-hop, and positivity.

Ready Set Go! was nominated for a 65th Grammy Award for Best Children's Music Album.

Discography 

Victor Wooten - Words and Tones ("Get it Right", "Say Word", "Heaven") (2012)
2NE1 - 2NE1 GLOBAL TOUR NEW EVOLUTION IN SEOUL! DVD (2012) 
2NE1 - GLOBAL TOUR NEW EVOLUTION IN SEOUL! Live CD (Dec 4, 2012) 
will.i.am – Songs About Girls ("She's a Star") (2007)
NX Zero – A Melhor Parte De Mim 0.2 (2010)
Beyoncé Knowles – The Beyoncé Experience Live (2007)
Beyoncé Knowles – I Am... Sasha Fierce (2010)
Beyoncé Knowles – Live in Vegas Instrumentals (2010)
Beyoncé Knowles – Irreplaceable Live at Glastonbury (2011)
Essence Music Festival, Vol 4: The Collection (Live) ("Single Ladies") (2011)
Victor Wooten – Live in America (2001)
Victor Wooten - Soul Circus (2005)
Béla Fleck and the Flecktones – Little Worlds ("The Ballad of Jed Clampett") (2003)
Divinity Roxx – Ain’t No Other Way (2003)
Divinity Roxx - The Roxx Boxx Experience (2012)
Divinity Roxx - ImPossible (2016)

Television Appearances
Divinity appeared on the television show The Soul Man alongside the musical guest B.o.B. while playing bass on his Promo Tour for the album Underground Luxury.

Divinity is currently the bass player in the house band for the BET produced television show Black Girls Rock! (2014-2016), backing such artists as Erykah Badu, Patti Labelle, Gladys Knight, Brandy, Monica and Jazmine Sullivan.

References

External links 
 
Divinity Roxx at CD Baby
Divinity Roxx at ReverbNation

African-American guitarists
American bass guitarists
Women bass guitarists
Living people
Year of birth missing (living people)
American women guitarists
African-American women musicians
21st-century African-American people
21st-century African-American women
American lesbian musicians